Alline Dawn Lawrie  (born 3 November 1938) is an Australian former politician. She was the independent member for Nightcliff in the Northern Territory Legislative Assembly from 1974 to 1983; in the First Assembly, she and fellow independent Ron Withnall were the sole non-Country Liberal Party members.

Early life
Lawrie was born in Melbourne in 1938. She moved to Alice Springs in the 1950s. She then settled in Darwin in 1960, where she worked as a public servant.

Career

|}
Lawrie joined the Northern Territory Parliament in 1971, firstly as an independent member of the Legislative Council (1971–74) then as the independent member for Nightcliff (1974–1983).

After politics, Lawrie and her husband established a community newspaper, the Palmerston & Northern Suburbs, which was published from 1983 to 1985. Lawrie was appointed as the first Regional Director for the Australian Human Rights and Equal Opportunity Commission in 1986. She served as the Administrator of the Cocos Keeling Islands from 1988 to 1990 and was the first NT Anti-Discrimination Commissioner. She is also a justice of the peace and a registered civil marriage celebrant.

She is the mother of Delia Lawrie, former leader of the Labor Party and the opposition in the Northern Territory.

References

|-

1938 births
Living people
Members of the Northern Territory Legislative Assembly
Members of the Northern Territory Legislative Council
Independent members of the Northern Territory Legislative Assembly
Cocos (Keeling) Islands administrators
Women members of the Northern Territory Legislative Assembly
Recipients of the Centenary Medal
Members of the Order of Australia